Akshay Brahmbhatt (born 26 January 1996) is an Indian cricketer. He made his first-class debut for Baroda in the 2016–17 Ranji Trophy on 21 November 2016.

References

External links
 

1996 births
Living people
Indian cricketers
Baroda cricketers
Place of birth missing (living people)